The 11103 / 04 Jhansi–Bandra Terminus Express is an Express train belonging to Indian Railways – North Central Railway zone that runs between  and  in India.

It operates as train number 11103 from Jhansi Junction to Bandra Terminus and as train number 11104 in the reverse direction, serving the states of Uttar Pradesh, Madhya Pradesh, Gujarat & Maharashtra.

Coaches

The train has LHB coach with max speed of 160 km/hour. The train consists of 15 coaches:

 3 AC 3 tier
 4 Sleeper class
 6 Unreserved/General
 2 Seating cum Luggage Rake

As is customary with most train services in India, coach composition may be amended at the discretion of Indian Railways depending on demand.

Service

11103  Jhansi–Bandra Terminus Express covers the distance of 1318 kilometres in 23 hours 55 mins  & in 25 hours 35 mins as 11104 Bandra Terminus–Jhansi Express .

Route and Halts

Reversals

Rake sharing

The train shares its rake with 11105/11106 Pratham Swatrantata Sangram Express.

Traction

Upon introduction, despite electrification of at least 739 km (56%) of the route between  & Bandra Terminus, it was hauled end to end by a Jhansi-based WDM-3A.

It is now hauled by a Jhansi-based WDM-3A / WDM-3D between Jhansi Junction &  handing over to a Vadodara-based WAP-4E or WAP-5.

Schedule

References

External links

Transport in Mumbai
Trains from Jhansi
Express trains in India
Rail transport in Madhya Pradesh
Rail transport in Gujarat
Rail transport in Maharashtra
Railway services introduced in 2012